Ho Chi Minh City Customs F.C. (Saigon Customs FC).was a Vietnamese football club based in Ho Chi Minh City. They were champions in the 1991 season of the V-League, Vietnam's top-level association football league.

Achievements

National competitions

League
V.League 1:
 Winners : 1991
 Runners-up :  1982-83, 1986
 Third place : 1980, 1990
V.League 2:
 Runners-up : 2001
South Vietnam V-League:
 Winners (2) : 1961/62, 1966
Cup
Vietnamese Cup:
 Winners :      1996, 1997
 Runners-up : 1998

Notes and references

Football clubs in Vietnam
Football clubs in Ho Chi Minh City
Works association football clubs in Vietnam